"Letter in the Sky" is a song recorded by Japanese-American singer-songwriter Ai featuring American pop band The Jacksons. Originally released digitally on October 19, 2011, by EMI Music Japan, it was released physically on December 14, 2011, alongside "Happiness" as an A-side. "Letter in the Sky" served as the lead single from Ai's ninth studio album, Independent (2012).

Background 
In April 2011, Ai presented a music documentary, Ai Miss Michael Jackson: King of Pop no Kiseki, that was recorded for Music On! TV. In the documentary, she traveled to the United States and interviewed members of the Jackson family in their home.

Ai left Universal and signed a global publishing deal with EMI to release her music worldwide in June 2011. Signing to EMI Music Japan, she started to work on her ninth studio album.

In October 2011, "Letter in the Sky" was announced as Ai's first single under EMI Music Japan. Originally released digitally on October 19, 2011, a physical copy was announced to be released in December.

Release 
"Letter in the Sky" served as the theme song for the Michael Jackson Tribute: Live in Tokyo concert that took place December 13 and 14th, 2011 at Yoyogi National Stadium.

Music video 
A music video was released on October 19, 2011. Various clips from the recording session of "Letter in the Sky" are used in the video.

Track listing

Charts

Credit and personnel 
Credits adapted from Tidal.
 Ai Uemura – vocals, songwriter, producer
 Jackie Jackson – vocals
 Marlon Jackson – vocals
 Tito Jackson – vocals
 Curtis Jenkins – songwriter
 Danny Lashine – songwriter
 King David "The Future" – producer, songwriter, programming
 Jesse Josefsson – guitar
 Dan Manzoor – bass (vocal)

References 

2011 singles
2011 songs
Ai (singer) songs
The Jackson 5 songs
EMI Music Japan singles
Songs about Michael Jackson
Songs written by Ai (singer)
Song recordings produced by Ai (singer)